Maria Simon (born 6 February 1976) is a German actress.

Family and background 
Simon's German father originally hailed from Leipzig and studied mathematics in Leningrad. There he met Simon's Russian-Jewish mother, Olga, who studied electronics and originally hailed from Kazakhstan. The couple married while studying.

Maria Simon is the younger sister of actress Susanna Simon, who was born on 23 July 1968, in Almaty, Kazakhstan. Maria was born and brought up in the former East Germany, but moved to New York City in 1990 to live with her father, a computer expert with the United Nations, and her sister Dalena Simon. She also has a sister named Alyssa.

Simon has four children, the first from a former relationship with the actor Devid Striesow, and three with her husband, the actor Bernd Michael Lade.

Education 
After finishing school she moved back to the newly reunited Germany to study acting at the Academy of Performing Arts Ernst Busch in Berlin where she received her diploma in 1999.

Roles and awards 
She won the award for Best Actress for her role in the film Zornige Küsse at the 22nd Moscow International Film Festival in 2000. Simon was nominated as the best supporting actress in the 2003 German Film Awards, and was named European Shooting Star (i.e., best newcomer) at the 2004 Berlinale. In the same year she played Polly in Bertolt Brechts Dreigroschenoper at the Maxim Gorki Theater in Berlin. Her TV movie Kleine Schwester was nominated for the Adolf Grimme Awards in 2005.

Filmography
Angry Kisses (1999), as Lea
 (2001), as Johanna
Erste Ehe (2002), as Dorit (USA title: Portrait of a Married Couple)
My Daughter's Tears (2002), as Stefanie (USA title: Against All Evidence, German title: Meine Tochter ist keine Mörderin)
Good Bye, Lenin! (2003), as Ariane Kerner
Distant Lights (2003), as Sonja
Luther (2003), as Hanna

TV Work
Jenny Berlin: Tod am Meer (2000, TV series episode), as Tanja Schulz
Mord im Swingerclub (2000, TV film), as Susanna Bach
HeliCops – Einsatz über Berlin: Fehlgeleitet (2001, TV series episode), as Biene Virchow
Balko: Der Schweinemann (2001, TV series episode), as Marischka
Verbotene Küsse (2001, TV film), as Andrea
Jonathans Liebe (2001, TV film), as Nina Buchwald
Tatort: Verrat (2002, TV series episode), as Lisa Mattern
Alarm für Cobra 11 - Die Autobahnpolizei: Die Clique (2002, TV series episode), as Laura Friedrich
Tatort: Reise ins Nichts (2002, TV series episode), as Sabine Hallmeier
Spurlos – Ein Baby verschwindet (2003, TV film), as Andrea Bär
Fast perfekt verlobt (2003, TV film), as Nika Kreschninski
K3 – Kripo Hamburg: Auf dünnem Eis (2003, TV series episode), as Kathrin Leutgeb
Spur & Partner (2003, TV series), as Frau Stolz/Hausmädchen/Eva Hermann
Carola Stern's Double Life (2004, TV film), as Carola Stern
Kleine Schwester (2004, TV film), as Katrin Rubakow
Tatort: Feuertaufe (2005, TV series episode), as Sabine Gerber
Tatort: Minenspiel (2005, TV series episode), as Hannah Siems
Die Pathologin (2006, TV film), as Leo
 (2006, TV film), as Lona
 (2023, TV miniseries), as Anna Klettmann

References

External links

 german-films.de: »A portrait of Maria Simon – Shooting Star«

1976 births
20th-century German actresses
21st-century German actresses
Actors from Leipzig
Ernst Busch Academy of Dramatic Arts alumni
German film actresses
German television actresses
German people of Russian-Jewish descent
German stage actresses
Living people